Sussex County is a rural county located in the Commonwealth of Virginia. As of the 2020 census, the population was 10,829. Its county seat is Sussex. It was formed in 1754 from Surry County.  The county is named after the county of Sussex, England.

Sussex County is included in the Greater Richmond Region.

History
Native Americans may have settled near Cactus Hill along the Nottoway River in what became Sussex county as long as 10,000 years ago. The Nottoway people, speaking an Iroquoian language, were later part of the Powhatan Confederacy.

When colonists arrived from England in 1607, some traveled along the Nottoway River, but when they established the first counties, James City County included both sides of the James River all the way to the North Carolina line. The south side of the James River became Surry County in 1652. Virginia's General Assembly formed Sussex County from the southwestern end of Surry County in 1754.

Sussex County has maintained a predominantly agricultural economy, as well as its historic heritage for over four centuries. It includes the Sussex County Courthouse Historic District and the Waverly Downtown Historic District, the Nottoway Archeological Site and six historic homes on the National Register.

The largest forest fire in Virginia's recorded history occurred on April 5, 1943, destroying more than 12,000 acres in just six hours, while most firefighters were paying their respects at the funeral of Ella Darden Gray, matriarch of one of the county's leading families, and whose son Garland Gray would become a key figure in the Massive Resistance crisis concerning desegregating Virginia's public schools about a decade later.

Geography

Adjacent counties
 Dinwiddie County - northwest
 Prince George County - north
 Surry County - northeast
 Southampton County - southeast
 Greensville County - southwest

Major highways
  the major north–south highway on the Eastern Seaboard enters Sussex County from Greensville County. Access to the county is available at Exits 17, 20, 24, 31, and 33 before the road crosses the Sussex-Prince George County Line.
 , the principal south–north route Sussex County until it was supplanted by I-95. A spur of US Route 1, it enters Sussex County from Greensville County, serves mainly as a frontage road along I-95, and leaves at Prince George County south of Carson.
 , a major west-to-east corridor that has a brief southeastern run in the northeastern section of Sussex County, as a connecting route between the Central Appalachian Mountains and the Hampton Roads area. A spur of US 60, it enters Sussex County from Disputanta in Prince George County, serves the communities of Waverly and Wakefield before leaving the county at Southampton County northwest of Ivor.
 , a south–north state road that runs northeast from US 460 along East Main Street, then turns north onto Birch Island Road into Surry County towards the Jamestown-Scotland Ferry and Williamsburg.
 , a south–north state road that enters the state from North Carolina and the county from the cotton fields of Southampton County. The route runs mainly northwest along Jerusalem Plank Road through the communities of Homeville and Lambs before leaving the county at the Sussex-Prince George County Line.
 , the west–east state road that runs from Dinwiddie County through Stony Creek, West Hope and Sussex, then enters Surry County after passing through Waverly. A business route of SR 40 exists within Stony Creek.
 , a local west–east state route in Jarratt running northeast along South Allen Road then turns southeast along Jarratt Avenue both in Sussex and Greensville Counties, the latter of which is where it ends at US 301.

Demographics

2020 census

Note: the US Census treats Hispanic/Latino as an ethnic category. This table excludes Latinos from the racial categories and assigns them to a separate category. Hispanics/Latinos can be of any race.

2010 Census
As of the 2010 United States Census, there were 12,087 people living in the county, of which 58.1% were Black or African American, 39.3% White, 0.4% Asian, 0.2% Native American, 1.3% of some other race and 0.8% of two or more races. 2.2% were Hispanic or Latino (of any race).

As of the census of 2000, there were 12,504 people, 4,126 households, and 2,809 families living in the county.  The population density was 26 people per square mile (10/km2).  There were 4,653 housing units at an average density of 10 per square mile (4/km2).  The racial makeup of the county was 62.13% Black or African American, 36.39% White, 0.13% Native American, 0.12% Asian, 0.02% Pacific Islander, 0.54% from other races, and 0.67% from two or more races.  0.82% of the population were Hispanic or Latino of any race.

There were 4,126 households, out of which 28.50% had children under the age of 18 living with them, 45.00% were married couples living together, 18.90% had a female householder with no husband present, and 31.90% were non-families. 28.20% of all households were made up of individuals, and 12.40% had someone living alone who was 65 years of age or older.  The average household size was 2.41 and the average family size was 2.94.

In the county, the population was spread out, with 19.60% under the age of 18, 9.00% from 18 to 24, 34.40% from 25 to 44, 23.60% from 45 to 64, and 13.40% who were 65 years of age or older.  The median age was 38 years. For every 100 females there were 135.10 males.  For every 100 females age 18 and over, there were 142.30 males.

The median income for a household in the county was $31,007, and the median income for a family was $36,739. Males had a median income of $29,307 versus $22,001 for females. The per capita income for the county was $14,670.  About 12.80% of families and 16.10% of the population were below the poverty line, including 24.30% of those under age 18 and 19.20% of those age 65 or over.

Two prisons were built in Sussex County in the 1990s. Including the prisons, Sussex County was the fastest growing county in the United States. Excluding the prisons, the county population declined.

Education
Sussex County Public Schools operates public schools.

Blackwater Regional Library is the regional library system that provides services to the citizens of Sussex.

High school
 Sussex Central High School

Middle school
 Sussex Central Middle School

Elementary schools
 Sussex Central Elementary School

Charter/tech
 Appomattox Regional Governor's School for the Arts And Technology
 Rowanty Technical Center

Private schools
 Tidewater Academy
 Yale Seventh-day Adventist School

Government and infrastructure
The Virginia Department of Corrections operates the Sussex I State Prison and the Sussex II State Prison in unincorporated Sussex County, near Waverly. The Sussex I center housed the male death row. On August 3, 1998, the male death row moved to Sussex I from the Mecklenburg Correctional Center.

Politics

Communities

Towns
 Jarratt
 Stony Creek
 Wakefield
 Waverly

Census-designated place
 Sussex

Unincorporated communities
 Yale

See also

 National Register of Historic Places listings in Sussex County, Virginia

References

 
Virginia counties
1754 establishments in Virginia
Majority-minority counties and independent cities in Virginia